K. Rekha is a Malayalam short story writer and jo‌urnalist.

Biography
She was born on 30 September 1975 as daughter of Appukuttan Nair and Vasumathi amma, in Vellani at Irinjalakkuda of Thrissur District.
She completed her degree in mathematics from Sree Narayana College, Nattika and she completed her master's degree in Malayalam from Sree Kerala Varma College, Thrissur. She earned a journalism diploma from Kerala Media Academy, Kochin.

She was working as a journalist in Malayala Manorama from 2001 to 2018. Now, she is working Malayalam Lecturer in Bishop Moore College at Mavelikkara.

Awards and honours
She is a recipient of the I.C. Chacko Award instituted by the Kerala Sahitya Akademi for Arudeyo Oru Sakhavu. He work 	Nunayathi won the Abu Dhabi Sakthi Award for the year 2021 in children's literature category.

Selected works
 Ninnil Charunna Nerath
 Prakash Rajum Njanum
 Arudeyo Oru Saghavu
 Kannyakayum Pullingavum
 Rekhayude Kathakal

References

Living people
Malayalam short story writers
Writers from Kerala
Indian women short story writers
Indian women journalists
Malayalam-language journalists
21st-century Indian short story writers
Indian women poets
21st-century Indian poets
21st-century Indian journalists
Journalists from Kerala
21st-century Indian women writers
Women writers from Kerala
People from Irinjalakuda
Year of birth missing (living people)
Recipients of the Abu Dhabi Sakthi Award
Recipients of the Kerala Sahitya Akademi Award